Andrew Shandro (born May 20, 1971) is a professional mountain biker. Shandro has starred in many films and featured in mountain bike magazines worldwide. The majority of Shandro's pictures are taken by his close friend Sterling Lorence. Andrew was born and raised on the North Shore, British Columbia. He is a competitive individual, and enjoys spending time with his kids.

Career
Shandro began as a downhill racer. Eventually he decided to make a career of mountain biking and began starring in movies  and pushing the limits of mountain biking.  Shandro is one of the older riders, but remains one of the most respected. Shandro runs summer mountain biking camps where campers can receive coaching from world class mountain bikers. Shandro often rides at Whistler-Blackcomb.

His accomplishments include the following.
 Two Time World Cup Winner Downhill Mountain Bike
 Four Time Canadian National Champion Downhill MTB
 X-Games Gold Medalist Bikercross
 North American Champion Downhill MTB
 Multiple Podium and top Ten finisher US National Events
 Designed the Bikercross course for K2 Pro Event featured on ESPN
 Designed the World Cup Downhill course for Silver Star Mountain 1994

Sponsors
Shandro's sponsors include:Helly Hansen; Trek Bicycle Corporation; Shimano; Bontrager; Dakine; Sombrio; Bean Around The World; Whistler Blackcomb; Fox Racing Shox; Smith; Nike 6.0; and Giro.

References

External links
 WN Presents Andrew Shandro, Fourteen Video Clips Many of these clips are ads for brakes, etc. Accessed April 10, 2011

Canadian male cyclists
Downhill mountain bikers
Living people
1971 births
Freeride mountain bikers
Canadian mountain bikers